Lieutenant Colonel Iain Douglas Corden-Lloyd  (27 May 1938 – 17 February 1978) was a British Army officer and one of the highest ranking soldiers to be killed in action during the Troubles in Northern Ireland.

Career
Corden-Lloyd was commissioned into the 10th Princess Mary's Own Gurkha Rifles, later transferring to the Royal Green Jackets. He was subsequently seconded to the Special Air Service (SAS). In 1964, while serving in the 10th Princess Mary's Gurkha Rifles in Borneo, Corden-Lloyd was accused of involvement in the torture of an elderly Dayak civilian, on the basis of a Scottish missionary's report. In 1971, Corden-Lloyd took part in Operation Demetrius. He was awarded the Military Cross for distinguished service in Northern Ireland in 1972, although at the time the details of his action were not published for security reasons. He became commanding officer of the 2nd Battalion, Royal Green Jackets in 1976. That same year he was invested as an Officer of the Order of the British Empire (military).

Death
 See 1978 British Army Gazelle downing

Corden-Lloyd’s battalion was deployed to Northern Ireland in December 1977, at a time when hostilities in the province were at their peak. A few days after their arrival, his troops suffered their first casualties and regular engagements with the Provisional IRA continued over the following weeks. On 17 February, a Green Jackets observation post deployed around the village of Jonesborough began to take heavy fire from the "March Wall", which drew parallel to the border with Ireland to the east, along the Dromad woods. The soldiers returned fire, but the short distance to the border and the open ground prevented them from advancing.

Corden-Lloyd, as commanding officer, along with Captain Philip Schofield and Sergeant Ives flew in a Gazelle helicopter from the base at Bessbrook Mill to assess the situation and provide information to the troops. While flying low and fast over the scene of the engagement, the aircraft came under fire from the IRA. The pilot executed a torque turn and, in so doing, stalled his tail fenestron fan rotor and lost control of the aircraft. The helicopter crashed into the field bordered by the March Wall, around 700 metres from Jonesborough. Corden-Lloyd was killed instantly, while the other two passengers were seriously wounded.

The crash of a British Army helicopter and the death of such a high-ranking officer was used as propaganda by the Provisional IRA, which published a report of the action in An Phoblacht. Corden-Lloyd had been accused by republicans of brutality against Catholic civilians during the Green Jackets tour of 1971. Corden-Lloyd was awarded a posthumous mention in dispatches by the British government, "in recognition of gallant and distinguished service in Northern Ireland".

Personal life
Married with three sons at the time of his death, Corden-Lloyd is interred in Magdalen Hill Cemetery, Winchester.

References

1938 births
1978 deaths
Officers of the Order of the British Empire
Royal Green Jackets officers
Recipients of the Military Cross
British military personnel killed in The Troubles (Northern Ireland)
South African emigrants to the United Kingdom
People from Durban
People killed by the Provisional Irish Republican Army